Robin Benway is an author of young adult fiction from Orange County, USA.

She attended college at both New York University and the University of California at Los Angeles. 
She is most known for her novel Far from the Tree, which won the 2017 National Book Award for Young People's Literature.

Books

Also Known As Series 

 Also Known As (2013)
 Going Rogue (2014)

Standalones 

 Audrey, Wait! (2008)
 The Extraordinary Secrets of April, May & June (2010)
 Emmy & Oliver (2015)
 Far from the Tree (2017)

References

External links
Official site
Interview with Benway at Publishers Weekly (June 4, 2015)

American writers of young adult literature
American women children's writers
Living people
New York University alumni
University of California, Los Angeles alumni
Women writers of young adult literature
American children's writers
Year of birth missing (living people)
21st-century American women